The George Washington 250th Anniversary half dollar is a commemorative coin that was issued by the United States Mint in 1982 to commemorate the 250th anniversary of the birth of George Washington.

History 
The George Washington 250th Anniversary half dollar was the first modern United States commemorative coin.  Production of traditional commemorative coins had previously ended in 1954 with the Carver-Washington half dollar.

Production and sales 
Public Law 97-104 authorized a total mintage of 10,000,000 coins.  Two varieties of the coin were produced, one with a proof finish (struck at the San Francisco Mint with the "S" mint mark) and one with an uncirculated finish (struck at the Denver Mint with the "D" mint mark).  A total of 4,894,044  proof and 2,210,458 uncirculated coins were produced and sold.

See also 

 List of United States commemorative coins and medals (1980s)
 United States commemorative coins
 George Washington half eagle

References 

Birds in art
Cultural depictions of George Washington
Eagles on coins
Fifty-cent coins
Horses in art
Modern United States commemorative coins
United States silver coins